Strobilurus may refer to either of two different genera of organisms:
 Strobilurus (fungi), a genus of fungus
 Strobilurus, a genus of lizard containing the single species S. torquatus